The First Western Army was created in 1810 as part of the reorganisation of the Imperial Russian Army, and was intended as a defense against the north-western part of the Empire from the expected invasion by Napoleon. The total troops in this Army included 150 battalions, 128 squadrons, 19 cossack regiments, and 590 guns.

History
The command-in-chief of the First West Army on March 19 (April 2) 1812 was assigned to General of the Infantry M. B. Barklay de Tolli. However, after arriving 14 (26) April 1812 in Vilno at the general headquarters of the First West Army, the Emperor Alexander I became both legally and actually its commander-in-chief, since according to §18 of "Establishments for management of the large acting army”, introduced on January 27 (8) February 1812, “the presence of Emperor represents the main command authority of the army, unless when specified by an order, the acting commander-in-chief is directed to retain complete authority”. There was no such order, therefore, the Emperor assumed command of the army. When on the 7 (19) July 1812 the Emperor left the field army, M. B. Barklay de Tolli again became its commander-in-chief.

Commanders during the Napoleonic Wars
Commander-in-Chief Emperor Alexander I
Commander - General of the Infantry of M. B. Barclay de Tolly
Chief of Staff - General Lieutenant N. I. Lavrov
General-quartermaster - General Major S. A. Mukhin
Duty General - Fligel-Adjutant Colonel P. A. Kikin
Chief of Artillery - General Major Graf A. I. Kutaysov
Chief of Engineers - General Lieutenant Kh. I. Truzson
 1st Infantry Corps General Lieutenant Graf P. Kh. Witgenshteyn
 2nd Infantry Corps General Lieutenant K. G. Baggovut
 3rd Infantry Corps General Lieutenant N. A. Tuchkov I
 4th Infantry Corps General Lieutenant Graf P. A. Shuvalov
 5th Reserve Guard Corps Cesarevitch Constantine Pavlovich
 6th Infantry Corps General of the Infantry D. S. Dokhturov
 1st Cavalry Corps General Adjutant F. P. Uvarov
 2nd Cavalry Corps General Adjutant Baron F. K. Korf
 3rd Cavalry Corps General Major Graf P. P. Palen III
 Flying Cossack Corps General of the Cavalry M. I. Platov

References and note

Russian military units and formations of the Napoleonic Wars
Armies of the Russian Empire
Military units and formations established in 1810